Marotirao D. Tumpalliwar (b 10 Jul 1910 d 15 Nov 1971) was an Indian politician who represented Bombay State in Rajya Sabha during 1956–62. 

He was elected to Maharashtra State assembly for twice from Chimur in 1962 & 1967.

He died in 1971 and had two sons and two daughter.

References

1910 births
1971 deaths
Rajya Sabha members from Maharashtra
Maharashtra MLAs 1962–1967
People from Chandrapur district
Indian National Congress politicians from Maharashtra